The Southwestern Railroad started  a  gauge spur line from Sparta, Tennessee to McMinnville, Tennessee to connect with the McMinnville and Manchester Railroad.
The Southwestern Railroad Company was chartered in 1851–52 to build a railroad from Danville, Kentucky to McMinnville in less than ten years.  The company received several extensions to complete the road during and after the American Civil War.
Former Confederate general George Gibbs Dibrell served as president.  The company went bankrupt in 1871 having constructed only a small part of the road from McMinnville to Sparta.
Nashville, Chattanooga & St. Louis Railway (NC&StL) purchased the assets.  In 1884, NC&StL finished the  segment to Sparta to reach the coal mines at Bon Air, Tennessee.

The track is operated today by the Caney Fork & Western Railroad (CFWR).

References

External links
Caney Fork & Western Railroad (CFWR)

Defunct Tennessee railroads
Predecessors of the Nashville, Chattanooga and St. Louis Railway
Railway companies established in 1852
Railway companies disestablished in 1877
5 ft gauge railways in the United States
1852 establishments in Tennessee